Sky News with Martin Stanford is a news programme on Sky News which ran between 8:00pm and 10:00pm Monday to Friday between July 2006, and February 2007. As the name suggests, the show was usually fronted by Martin Stanford, however other presenters who stood in for Stanford included Colin Brazier and Martin Popplewell.

The show started on 10 July 2006, after a change in the channel's line-up. It replaced World News Tonight and then an hour of Sky News. It was an interactive show which encouraged viewers to contribute by using webcams and 3G phones to send video messages, or by email or SMS to send in comments or join in debates about the day's main news stories. The format changed in the event of breaking news and the show had different graphics and strings to other Sky News shows.

Following the cancellation of the show in February 2007, Stanford moved back to presenting Sky News Today, on weekday mornings from 9am-12pm, alongside Anna Jones. The show was replaced with News, Sport & Weather, a show giving viewers fifteen-minute news updates.

2006 British television series debuts
2007 British television series endings
Sky News
Sky UK original programming
English-language television shows
Sky television news shows